The Koster class is a class of five mine-countermeasure vessels currently in use by the Swedish Navy. Built between 1982 and 1993 as part of the seven-strong s, the last five ships of the class were given a comprehensive midlife upgrade between 2007 and 2010, which resulted in HMS Koster becoming the lead ship of the newly upgraded class of MCMVs. After the upgrade, the Swedish Navy expects that it will serve on for another 15 to 20 years. An identifying feature of the Koster class is the fire control radar on top of the bridge.

Overview
In December 2004, the Swedish Navy awarded Kockums a contract for the mid-life upgrade for five of the Landsort class (excluding HMS Landsort and HMS Arholma). The upgrade includes a new mine countermeasures (MCM) system, adaptations for international operations as well as a new air defence systems involving moving and modification of the Arte 726 from the Kaparen class fast patrol boats. The first is expected to be completed in 2008. The upgraded vessels will be renamed as the Koster class, as the first vessel to be upgraded is HMS Koster (formerly the third ship in the Landsort class).

On 31 January 2005 a contract exceeding €30 million was awarded to Atlas Elektronik for the upgrade of these five vessels with the Atlas Integrated MCM Systems (IMCMS-S). The systems will be commissioned into operational service between 2008 and 2009. The system combines minehunting, minesweeping, mine disposal, surveillance and communication with other naval forces. It comprises an Atlas MCM Tactical Command and Control system, a broadband Atlas HMS-12M hull-mounted sonar and an Atlas mine identification and disposal system (MIDS) Seafox. The IMCMS-S onboard also fully integrates sensors and effectors like the self-propelled variable depth sonar, underwater positioning system, navigation radar and sensors, conventional MIDS systems, and air defence system.

The vessels are also upgraded to have Link 16 capability.

See also
Bedok class mine countermeasures vessel
Landsort class mine countermeasures vessel

References
Citations

External links
https://web.archive.org/web/20100822064801/http://www.forsvarsmakten.se/sv/Materiel-och-teknik/fartyg/Minrojningsfartyg-Koster/

Mine warfare vessels of the Swedish Navy
Mine warfare vessel classes